The men's team competition at the 2017 European Judo Championships in Warsaw was held on 23 April at the Torwar Hall.

Each team consisted of five judokas from the –66, 73, 81, 90 and +90 kg categories.

Teams

Results

Repechage

External links
 

Mteam
EU 2017
European Men's Team Judo Championships